Doterel may refer to:
HMS Doterel, several ships of the Royal Navy
Doterel class sloop, a class of ship
Dotterel, a wading bird, formerly spelled doterel

See also
Dotterel (disambiguation)